Brad Inman may refer to:

Brad Inman (soccer) (born 1991), footballer who plays for Western United
Bradley Inman, Internet entrepreneur and founder of several companies